The Tour Eiffel Bridge, also known as the Montcalm Street Bridge is a small but ornate bridge in Gatineau, Quebec, Canada. There had long been a bridge across Brewery Creek, but by the 1980s it needed to be replaced. Hull and the National Capital Commission were working to turn the Brewery Creek area into a tourist and cultural district. It was decided to build an ornate structure. Incorporated in the bridge was an original steel girder from the Eiffel Tower, that had been part of a recently disassembled staircase. The girder was donated to Hull by Paris mayor Jacques Chirac. Architects Paul Martineau and Eric Haar modeled the bridge on Parisian style. It opened in 1990.

References
"Hull builds bridge to excellence." Bob Phillips. The Ottawa Citizen. Ottawa, Ont.: Sep 2, 1990. pg. A.7

Bridges in Gatineau
Bridges completed in 1990
1990 establishments in Quebec